Thorium (90Th) has seven naturally occurring isotopes but none are stable. One isotope, 232Th, is relatively stable, with a half-life of 1.405×1010 years, considerably longer than the age of the Earth, and even slightly longer than the generally accepted age of the universe. This isotope makes up nearly all natural thorium, so thorium was considered to be mononuclidic. However, in 2013, IUPAC reclassified thorium as binuclidic, due to large amounts of 230Th in deep seawater. Thorium has a characteristic terrestrial isotopic composition and thus a standard atomic weight can be given.

Thirty-one radioisotopes have been characterized, with the most stable being 232Th, 230Th with a half-life of 75,380 years, 229Th with a half-life of 7,917 years, and 228Th with a half-life of 1.92 years. All of the remaining radioactive isotopes have half-lives that are less than thirty days and the majority of these have half-lives that are less than ten minutes. One isotope, 229Th, has a nuclear isomer (or metastable state) with a remarkably low excitation energy, recently measured to be 8.28 ± 0.17 eV. It has been proposed to perform laser spectroscopy of the 229Th nucleus and use the low-energy transition for the development of a nuclear clock of extremely high accuracy.

The known isotopes of thorium range in mass number from 207 to 238.

List of isotopes 

|-
| 207Th
|
| style="text-align:right" | 90
| style="text-align:right" | 117
| 
| 9.7(+46.6−4.4) ms
| α
| 203Ra
| 
|
|
|-
| 208Th
|
| style="text-align:right" | 90
| style="text-align:right" | 118
| 208.01791(4)
| 1.7(+1.7-0.6) ms
| α
| 204Ra
| 0+
|
|
|-
| 209Th
|
| style="text-align:right" | 90
| style="text-align:right" | 119
| 209.01772(11)
| 7(5) ms[3.8(+69−15)]
| α
| 205Ra
| 5/2−#
|
|
|-
| rowspan=2|210Th
| rowspan=2|
| rowspan=2 style="text-align:right" | 90
| rowspan=2 style="text-align:right" | 120
| rowspan=2|210.015075(27)
| rowspan=2|17(11) ms[9(+17−4) ms]
| α
| 206Ra
| rowspan=2|0+
| rowspan=2|
| rowspan=2|
|-
| β+ (rare)
| 210Ac
|-
| rowspan=2|211Th
| rowspan=2|
| rowspan=2 style="text-align:right" | 90
| rowspan=2 style="text-align:right" | 121
| rowspan=2|211.01493(8)
| rowspan=2|48(20) ms[0.04(+3−1) s]
| α
| 207Ra
| rowspan=2|5/2−#
| rowspan=2|
| rowspan=2|
|-
| β+ (rare)
| 211Ac
|-
| rowspan=2|212Th
| rowspan=2|
| rowspan=2 style="text-align:right" | 90
| rowspan=2 style="text-align:right" | 122
| rowspan=2|212.01298(2)
| rowspan=2|36(15) ms[30(+20-10) ms]
| α (99.7%)
| 208Ra
| rowspan=2|0+
| rowspan=2|
| rowspan=2|
|-
| β+ (.3%)
| 212Ac
|-
| rowspan=2|213Th
| rowspan=2|
| rowspan=2 style="text-align:right" | 90
| rowspan=2 style="text-align:right" | 123
| rowspan=2|213.01301(8)
| rowspan=2|140(25) ms
| α
| 209Ra
| rowspan=2|5/2−#
| rowspan=2|
| rowspan=2|
|-
| β+ (rare)
| 213Ac
|-
| 214Th
|
| style="text-align:right" | 90
| style="text-align:right" | 124
| 214.011500(18)
| 100(25) ms
| α
| 210Ra
| 0+
|
|
|-
| 215Th
|
| style="text-align:right" | 90
| style="text-align:right" | 125
| 215.011730(29)
| 1.2(2) s
| α
| 211Ra
| (1/2−)
|
|
|-
| rowspan=2|216Th
| rowspan=2|
| rowspan=2 style="text-align:right" | 90
| rowspan=2 style="text-align:right" | 126
| rowspan=2|216.011062(14)
| rowspan=2|26.8(3) ms
| α (99.99%)
| 212Ra
| rowspan=2|0+
| rowspan=2|
| rowspan=2|
|-
| β+ (.006%)
| 216Ac
|-
| style="text-indent:1em" | 216m1Th
|
| colspan="3" style="text-indent:2em" | 2042(13) keV
| 137(4) μs
|
|
| (8+)
|
|
|-
| style="text-indent:1em" | 216m2Th
|
| colspan="3" style="text-indent:2em" | 2637(20) keV
| 615(55) ns
|
|
| (11−)
|
|
|-
| 217Th
|
| style="text-align:right" | 90
| style="text-align:right" | 127
| 217.013114(22)
| 240(5) μs
| α
| 213Ra
| (9/2+)
|
|
|-
| 218Th
|
| style="text-align:right" | 90
| style="text-align:right" | 128
| 218.013284(14)
| 109(13) ns
| α
| 214Ra
| 0+
|
|
|-
| rowspan=2|219Th
| rowspan=2|
| rowspan=2 style="text-align:right" | 90
| rowspan=2 style="text-align:right" | 129
| rowspan=2|219.01554(5)
| rowspan=2|1.05(3) μs
| α
| 215Ra
| rowspan=2|9/2+#
| rowspan=2|
| rowspan=2|
|-
| β+ (10−7%)
| 219Ac
|-
| rowspan=2|220Th
| rowspan=2|
| rowspan=2 style="text-align:right" | 90
| rowspan=2 style="text-align:right" | 130
| rowspan=2|220.015748(24)
| rowspan=2|9.7(6) μs
| α
| 216Ra
| rowspan=2|0+
| rowspan=2|
| rowspan=2|
|-
| EC (2×10−7%)
| 220Ac
|-
| 221Th
|
| style="text-align:right" | 90
| style="text-align:right" | 131
| 221.018184(10)
| 1.73(3) ms
| α
| 217Ra
| (7/2+)
|
|
|-
| rowspan=2|222Th
| rowspan=2|
| rowspan=2 style="text-align:right" | 90
| rowspan=2 style="text-align:right" | 132
| rowspan=2|222.018468(13)
| rowspan=2|2.237(13) ms
| α
| 218Ra
| rowspan=2|0+
| rowspan=2|
| rowspan=2|
|-
| EC (1.3×10−8%)
| 222Ac
|-
| 223Th
|
| style="text-align:right" | 90
| style="text-align:right" | 133
| 223.020811(10)
| 0.60(2) s
| α
| 219Ra
| (5/2)+
|
|
|-
| rowspan=3|224Th
| rowspan=3|
| rowspan=3 style="text-align:right" | 90
| rowspan=3 style="text-align:right" | 134
| rowspan=3|224.021467(12)
| rowspan=3|1.05(2) s
| α
| 220Ra
| rowspan=3|0+
| rowspan=3|
| rowspan=3|
|-
| β+β+ (rare)
| 224Ra
|-
| CD (rare)
| 208Pb16O
|-
| rowspan=2|225Th
| rowspan=2|
| rowspan=2 style="text-align:right" | 90
| rowspan=2 style="text-align:right" | 135
| rowspan=2|225.023951(5)
| rowspan=2|8.72(4) min
| α (90%)
| 221Ra
| rowspan=2|(3/2)+
| rowspan=2|
| rowspan=2|
|-
| EC (10%)
| 225Ac
|-
| 226Th
|
| style="text-align:right" | 90
| style="text-align:right" | 136
| 226.024903(5)
| 30.57(10) min
| α
| 222Ra
| 0+
|
|
|-
| 227Th
| Radioactinium
| style="text-align:right" | 90
| style="text-align:right" | 137
| 227.0277041(27)
| 18.68(9) d
| α
| 223Ra
| 1/2+
| Trace
|
|-
| rowspan=2|228Th
| rowspan=2|Radiothorium
| rowspan=2 style="text-align:right" | 90
| rowspan=2 style="text-align:right" | 138
| rowspan=2|228.0287411(24)
| rowspan=2|1.9116(16) y
| α
| 224Ra
| rowspan=2|0+
| rowspan=2|Trace
| rowspan=2|
|-
| CD (1.3×10−11%)
| 208Pb20O
|-
| 229Th
|
| style="text-align:right" | 90
| style="text-align:right" | 139
| 229.031762(3)
| 7.917(46)×103 y
| α
| 225Ra
| 5/2+
| Trace
|
|-
| style="text-indent:1em" | 229mTh
|
| colspan="3" style="text-indent:2em" | 8.3(2) eV
| 7(1) μs
| IT
| 229Th
| 3/2+
|
|
|-
| rowspan=3|230Th
| rowspan=3|Ionium
| rowspan=3 style="text-align:right" | 90
| rowspan=3 style="text-align:right" | 140
| rowspan=3|230.0331338(19)
| rowspan=3|7.538(30)×104 y
| α
| 226Ra
| rowspan=3|0+
| rowspan=3|0.0002(2)
| rowspan=3|
|-
| CD (5.6×10−11%)
| 206Hg24Ne
|-
| SF (5×10−11%)
| (Various)
|-
| rowspan=2|231Th
| rowspan=2|Uranium Y
| rowspan=2 style="text-align:right" | 90
| rowspan=2 style="text-align:right" | 141
| rowspan=2|231.0363043(19)
| rowspan=2|25.52(1) h
| β−
| 231Pa
| rowspan=2|5/2+
| rowspan=2|Trace
| rowspan=2|
|-
| α (10−8%)
| 227Ra
|-
| rowspan=4|232Th
| rowspan=4|Thorium
| rowspan=4 style="text-align:right" | 90
| rowspan=4 style="text-align:right" | 142
| rowspan=4|232.0380553(21)
| rowspan=4|1.405(6)×1010 y
| α
| 228Ra
| rowspan=4|0+
| rowspan=4|0.9998(2)
| rowspan=4|
|-
| β−β− (rare)
| 232U
|-
| SF (1.1×10−9%)
| (various)
|-
| CD (2.78×10−10%)
| 182Yb26Ne24Ne
|-
| 233Th
|
| style="text-align:right" | 90
| style="text-align:right" | 143
| 233.0415818(21)
| 21.83(4) min
| β−
| 233Pa
| 1/2+
|
|
|-
| 234Th
| Uranium X1
| style="text-align:right" | 90
| style="text-align:right" | 144
| 234.043601(4)
| 24.10(3) d
| β−
| 234mPa
| 0+
| Trace
|
|-
| 235Th
|
| style="text-align:right" | 90
| style="text-align:right" | 145
| 235.04751(5)
| 7.2(1) min
| β−
| 235Pa
| (1/2+)#
|
|
|-
| 236Th
|
| style="text-align:right" | 90
| style="text-align:right" | 146
| 236.04987(21)#
| 37.5(2) min
| β−
| 236Pa
| 0+
|
|
|-
| 237Th
|
| style="text-align:right" | 90
| style="text-align:right" | 147
| 237.05389(39)#
| 4.8(5) min
| β−
| 237Pa
| 5/2+#
|
|
|-
| 238Th
|
| style="text-align:right" | 90
| style="text-align:right" | 148
| 238.0565(3)#
| 9.4(20) min
| β−
| 238Pa
| 0+
|
|

Uses 
Thorium has been suggested for use in thorium-based nuclear power.

In many countries the use of thorium in consumer products is banned or discouraged because it is radioactive.

It is currently used in cathodes of vacuum tubes, for a combination of physical stability at high temperature and a low work energy required to remove an electron from its surface.

It has, for about a century, been used in mantles of gas and vapor lamps such as gas lights and camping lanterns.

Low dispersion lenses
Thorium was also used in certain glass elements of Aero-Ektar lenses made by Kodak during World War II. Thus they are mildly radioactive. Two of the glass elements in the f/2.5 Aero-Ektar lenses are 11% and 13% thorium by weight. The thorium-containing glasses were used because they have a high refractive index with a low dispersion (variation of index with wavelength), a highly desirable property. Many surviving Aero-Ektar lenses have a tea colored tint, possibly due to radiation damage to the glass.

These lenses were used for aerial reconnaissance because the radiation level is not high enough to fog film over a short period. This would indicate the radiation level is reasonably safe. However, when not in use, it would be prudent to store these lenses as far as possible from normally inhabited areas; allowing the inverse square relationship to attenuate the radiation.

Actinides vs. fission products

Notable isotopes

Thorium-228 
228Th is an isotope of thorium with 138 neutrons. It was once named Radiothorium, due to its occurrence in the disintegration chain of thorium-232. It has a half-life of 1.9116 years. It undergoes alpha decay to 224Ra. Occasionally it decays by the unusual route of cluster decay, emitting a nucleus of 20O and producing stable 208Pb. It is a daughter isotope of 232U in the thorium decay series.

228Th has an atomic weight of 228.0287411 grams/mole.

Together with its decay product 224Ra it is used for alpha particle radiation therapy.

Thorium-229
229Th is a radioactive isotope of thorium that decays by alpha emission with a half-life of 7917 years.
229Th is produced by the decay of uranium-233, and its principal use is for the production of the medical isotopes actinium-225 and bismuth-213.

Thorium-229m
In 1976, gamma ray spectroscopy first indicated that 229Th has a nuclear isomer, 229mTh, with a remarkably low excitation energy. At that time the energy was inferred to be below 100 eV, purely based on the non-observation of the isomer's direct decay. However, in 1990, further measurements led to the conclusion that the energy is almost certainly below 10 eV, making the isomer to be the one of lowest known excitation energy. In the following years, the energy was further constrained to 3.5 ± 1.0 eV, which was for a long time the accepted energy value. 
Such low energy soon raised some interest as it conceptually allows for direct laser excitation of the nuclear state, which leads to some interesting potential applications, e.g. the development of a nuclear clock of very high accuracy or as a qubit for quantum computing.

Nuclear laser excitation of 229mTh and therefore also the development of a nuclear clock has so far been impeded by an insufficient knowledge about the isomeric properties. A precise knowledge of the isomeric energy is of particular importance in this context, as it determines the required laser technology and shortens the scanning times when searching for the direct excitation. This triggered a multitude of investigations, both theoretical and experimental, trying to determine the transition energy precisely and to specify other properties of the isomeric state of 229Th (such as the lifetime and the magnetic moment).

The direct observation of photons emitted in the isomeric decay would significantly help to pin down the isomeric energy value. Unfortunately, until today, there has been no fully conclusive report on the detection of photons emitted in the decay of 229mTh. Instead, improved gamma ray spectroscopy measurements using an advanced high-resolution X-ray microcalorimeter were carried out in 2007, yielding a new value for the transition energy of E = 7.6 ± 0.5 eV, corrected to E = 7.8 ± 0.5 eV in 2009. This shift in isomeric energy from 3.5 eV to 7.8 eV possibly explains why several early attempts to directly observe the transition were unsuccessful.
Still, most of the recent searches for light emitted in the isomeric decay failed to observe any signal, pointing towards a potentially strong non-radiative decay channel. A direct detection of photons emitted in the isomeric decay was claimed in 2012 and again in 2018. However, both reports are currently subject to controversial discussions within the community.

A direct detection of electrons being emitted in the internal conversion decay channel of 229mTh was achieved in 2016. However, at the time the isomer's transition energy could only be weakly constrained to between 6.3 and 18.3 eV. However, this value appears at odds with the 2018 preprint showing that a similar signal as an 8.4 eV xenon VUV photon can be shown, but with about  less energy and an 1880 s lifetime. In that paper, 229Th was embedded in SiO2, possibly resulting in an energy shift and altered lifetime, although the states involved are primarily nuclear, shielding them from electronic interactions.

As a peculiarity of the extremely low excitation energy, the lifetime of 229mTh very much depends on the electronic environment of the nucleus. In 229Th ions, the internal conversion decay channel is energetically forbidden, as the isomeric energy is below the energy that is required for further ionization of Th+. This leads to a lifetime that may approach the radiative lifetime of 229mTh, for which no measurement exists, but which has been theoretically predicted to be in the range between 103 to 104 seconds. Experimentally, for 229mTh2+ and 229mTh3+ ions, an isomeric lifetime of longer than 1 minute was found. Opposed to that, in neutral 229Th atoms the internal conversion decay channel is allowed, leading to an isomeric lifetime which is reduced by 9 orders of magnitude to about 10 microseconds. A lifetime in the range of a few microseconds was indeed confirmed in 2017 for neutral, surface bound 229mTh atoms, based on the detection of the internal conversion decay signal.

In a 2018 experiment, it was possible to perform a first laser-spectroscopic characterization of the nuclear properties of 229mTh. In this experiment, laser spectroscopy of the 229Th atomic shell was conducted using a 229Th2+ ion cloud with 2% of the ions in the nuclear excited state. This allowed to probe for the hyperfine shift induced by the different nuclear spin states of the ground and the isomeric state. In this way, a first experimental value for the magnetic dipole and the electric quadrupole moment of 229mTh could be inferred.

In 2019, the isomer's excitation energy was constrained to  based on the direct detection of internal conversion electrons and a secure population of 229mTh from the nuclear ground state was achieved by excitation of the 29 keV nuclear excited state via synchrotron radiation.

The 29189.93 eV excited state of 229Th decays to the isomeric state with a probability of 90%. Both measurements are further important steps towards the development of a nuclear clock. Also gamma spectroscopy experiments confirmed the 8.3 eV energy splitting from the distance to the 29189.93 eV level. 8.28 eV (150 nm) is reachable as a 7th harmonic of an ytterbium fiber laser by VUV frequency comb. Continuous wave phase matching for harmonic generation may be available.

Thorium-230
230Th is a radioactive isotope of thorium that can be used to date corals and determine ocean current flux. Ionium was a name given early in the study of radioactive elements to the 230Th isotope produced in the decay chain of 238U before it was realized that ionium and thorium are chemically identical. The symbol Io was used for this supposed element. (The name is still used in ionium–thorium dating.)

Thorium-231
231Th has 141 neutrons. It is the decay product of uranium-235. It is found in very small amounts on the earth and has a half-life of 25.5 hours. When it decays, it emits a beta ray and forms protactinium-231. It has a decay energy of 0.39 MeV. It has a mass of 231.0363043 grams/mole.

Thorium-232

232Th is the only primordial nuclide of thorium and makes up effectively all of natural thorium, with other isotopes of thorium appearing only in trace amounts as relatively short-lived decay products of uranium and thorium. 
The isotope decays by alpha decay with a half-life of 1.405 years, over three times the age of the Earth and approximately the age of the universe.
Its decay chain is the thorium series, eventually ending in lead-208. The remainder of the chain is quick; the longest half-lives in it are 5.75 years for radium-228 and 1.91 years for thorium-228, with all other half-lives totaling less than 15 days.

232Th is a fertile material able to absorb a neutron and undergo transmutation into the fissile nuclide uranium-233, which is the basis of the thorium fuel cycle.
In the form of Thorotrast, a thorium dioxide suspension, it was used as a contrast medium in early X-ray diagnostics. Thorium-232 is now classified as carcinogenic.

Thorium-233
233Th is an isotope of thorium that decays into protactinium-233 through beta decay. It has a half-life of 21.83 minutes.

Thorium-234
234Th is an isotope of thorium whose nuclei contain 144 neutrons. 234Th has a half-life of 24.1 days, and when it decays, it emits a beta particle, and in doing so, it transmutes into protactinium-234. 234Th has a mass of 234.0436 atomic mass units (amu), and it has a decay energy of about 270 keV (kiloelectronvolts). Uranium-238 usually decays into this isotope of thorium (although in rare cases it can undergo spontaneous fission instead).

References

 Isotope masses from:

 Isotopic compositions and standard atomic masses from:

 Half-life, spin, and isomer data selected from the following sources.

 
Thorium
Thorium